Chasty Rose Ballesteros is a Canadian actress who has had roles in Smallville, Supernatural, Psych, Sanctuary, Modern Family, The Big Bang Theory, and How I Met Your Mother.

Filmography

References

External links
 

21st-century Canadian actresses
Actresses from Vancouver
Canadian film actresses
Canadian television actresses
Living people
Canadian actresses of Filipino descent
Year of birth missing (living people)